"Et si tu n'existais pas"  is a 1975 song by Joe Dassin. It is the first track of his album Joe Dassin (Le Costume blanc). The lyrics are by Pierre Delanoë and Claude Lemesle, the music is by Salvatore Cutugno and Pasquale Losito.
The song was covered by Iggy Pop (in French) in 2012.

Track listings 
7" promo single CBS 3907 (1975, France)
A. "Et si tu n'existais pas" (3:25)
AA. "Ça va pas changer le monde" (3:00)

7" single CBS 4112, CBS C5 8122 (1976)
 "Et si tu n'existais pas" (3:25)
 "Salut" (3:20)
or
 "Salut" (3:20)
 "Et si tu n'existais pas" (3:25)

Charts

References

External links 
 
 
 
 10 essentiële nummers voor een geslaagde Thé Dansant – KnackFocus.be (in Dutch)

1975 songs
1975 singles
Joe Dassin songs
French songs
CBS Records singles
Songs written by Pierre Delanoë
Songs written by Toto Cutugno
Songs with lyrics by Vito Pallavicini
Number-one singles in France
Songs written by Claude Lemesle
Song recordings produced by Jacques Plait